Elizabeth Miller may refer to:

Elizabeth Miller (academic) (born 1939), professor at Memorial University of Newfoundland, specializing in Dracula
Elizabeth Cleveland Miller (1889–1936), American children's author
Elizabeth Miller (novelist) (1878–1961), American Hoosier novelist
Liz Miller (born 1957), British physician and writer
Elizabeth Miller (politician) (born 1967), Australian state politician
Elizabeth C. Miller (1920–1987), American biochemist and cancer researcher
Elizabeth C. Miller (ecologist), discoverer of Hemidactylus principensis
Elizabeth Ruby Miller (1905–1988), American politician
Elizabeth Smith Miller (1842–1911), advocate and financial supporter of the women's rights movement
Elizabeth Miller (1907–1977), also known as Lee Miller, American photographer

See also
Betty Miller (disambiguation)
Miller (surname)